Mehmet Kâzım Orbay (11 March 1887 – 3 June 1964) was a Turkish general and senator. He served as the third Chief of the General Staff of the Turkish Armed Forces.

Biography

Kâzım Orbay was born in Smyrna (present day: İzmir), Ottoman Empire in 1887. He graduated from Mühendishâne-i Berrî-i Hümâyûn (Imperial School of Military Engineering) and joined the army in the rank of an artillery lieutenant in 1904. After finishing the Staff College in 1907, he became a staff officer. In 1908, he attended military courses in Germany. In 1912-1913, he fought in the Balkan Wars. He was appointed chief adjutant of the Ministry of War in the Ottoman cabinet and served under Enver Pasha during World War I. In 1915, he was the Ottoman representative in the Niedermayer–Hentig Expedition to Afghanistan. He presented to Emir Habibullah Khan the Ottoman Sultan's declaration of jihad: a call to all Islamic peoples (including Afghanistan) to join the Central Powers and attack the Allies. Afghanistan was to attack British India.

After the defeat of the Ottoman Empire, he joined the independence movement in Anatolia. During the Turkish War of Independence, he held commanding positions in the Eastern Front Army between 1920 and 1922, fighting in the Caucasus. He also took part in the Battle of Dumlupınar in western Anatolia.

In 1926, he was promoted to  Korgeneral and appointed vice chief of the general staff. During 1928 and 1929, Kâzım Orbay served as Chief of the General Staff of the army of Afghanistan. Following his return to Turkey, he held high-ranking military posts; in 1935, he was promoted to Orgeneral.

Succeeding Fevzi Çakmak, he served as Chief of the General Staff of the Turkish Armed Forces from 12 January 1944 to 23 July 1946, when he resigned.

Kâzım Orbay retired on 6 July 1950. After the military coup of 1960, he was elected senator in 1961 and served as the president of the parliament.

He died of stomach cancer in Ankara and was laid to rest in the Turkish State Cemetery.

He was married to Mediha Hanım, sister of Enver Pasha, and they had a son named Haşmet. On 16 October 1945 Haşmet Orbay murdered physician Naci Arzan. The investigation of the Ankara Murder turned into a political scandal involving the Republican People's Party apparatus.

See also
List of high-ranking commanders of the Turkish War of Independence

References
 Milli Tarih: Sır gibi bir intihar Radikal, 7 July 2007

External links
Mehmet Kazım ORBAY in the official website of the Turkish General Staff 

1887 births
1964 deaths
People from İzmir
Ottoman Imperial School of Military Engineering alumni
Ottoman Military College alumni
Ottoman Army officers
Enver Pasha
Ottoman military personnel of World War I
Turkish military personnel of the Turkish–Armenian War
Turkish military personnel of the Greco-Turkish War (1919–1922)
Recipients of the Medal of Independence with Red Ribbon (Turkey)
Deputy Chiefs of the Turkish General Staff
General Commanders of the Gendarmerie of Turkey
Turkish Army generals
Chiefs of the Turkish General Staff
Speakers of the Parliament of Turkey
Deaths from cancer in Turkey
Deaths from stomach cancer
Burials at Turkish State Cemetery
People of the Dersim rebellion